Baboua is a village in the commune of Belel in the Adamawa Region of Cameroon.

Population 
In 1967, Baboua contained 523 people, principally Fula people.

In the 2005 census, 846 people were counted there.

Infrastructure 
Baboua has a public school.

References

Bibliography
 Jean Boutrais, 1993, Peuples et cultures de l'Adamaoua (Cameroun) : actes du colloque de Ngaoundéré du 14 au 16 janvier 1992, Paris : Éd. de l'ORSTOM u.a.
 Dictionnaire des villages de l'Adamaoua, ONAREST, Yaoundé, October 1974, 133 p.

External links
 Belel , on the website Communes et villes unies du Cameroun (CVUC)

Populated places in Adamawa Region